It's a Wonderful Christmas is an album by Christian recording artist Michael W. Smith. Released in October 2007, this epic album is Smith's third album of Christmas music and features four choirs and a 65-piece orchestra. About half the album is instrumental pieces, including "What Child is This", "Audrey's Gift", and "It's a Wonderful Christmas". Vocal numbers such as "The Promise" and "Christmas Angels" reflect Smith's trademark personal touch and evoke his previous Christmas albums, Christmas (1989) and Christmastime (1998). Smith utilizes the full sound of the orchestra and choirs to produce an album that exudes a "mastery of the adult contemporary sound" and adds "so richly to the Christmas songbook."

Track listing

Reception

It's a Wonderful Christmas sold 12,759 copies in its first week, 6,000 of them digital. The album has since sold 39,000 copies.

The album received several positive reviews. However, Billboard gave the album a mixed review.

In 2008, the album won a Dove Award for Christmas Album of the Year at the 39th GMA Dove Awards.

Personnel 
 Michael W. Smith – vocals (1, 3, 5, 7, 9, 11), grand piano (1–5, 8, 9, 10), arrangements
 David Hamilton – orchestra conductor (1-9, 11), orchestra arrangements (1, 2, 3, 7, 8, 9, 11), choir arrangements (1, 3, 5, 7, 9), synthesizer (1, 5), Hammond B3 organ (5), celeste (5), grand piano (11), rhythm track arrangements (11)
 Adam Lester – electric guitars (1, 5)
 James Gregory – bass (1, 5)
 Craig Nelson – upright bass (11)
 Paul Leim – drums (1, 5, 11)
 Sam Bacco – Scottish snare drum (6), bass drum (6)
 David Davidson – violin solo (4)
 Skip Cleavinger – Highland bagpipes (6), penny whistle (6), low whistle (8)
 Carl Marsh – orchestra arrangements (1, 5)
 Ronn Huff – orchestra arrangements (6)
 The London Session Orchestra – orchestra (1-9, 11)
 Perry Montague-Mason – concertmaster
 Isobel Griffiths – orchestra contractor
 Charlotte Matthews – orchestra contractor
 Lori Casteel – music preparation
 Mike Casteel – music preparation
 Ric Domenico – music preparation
 Eberhard Ramm – music preparation
 The Nashville Choir – choir (1, 3, 7, 9)
 John Coates – The Nashville Choir director (1, 3, 7, 9)
 Children's Choir – children choir (1, 5)
 Sandy Hamilton – Children's Choir director (1, 5)
 Kathy Goodrich – Children's Choir assistant director (1, 5)
 Marie Morris – Children's Choir assistant director (1, 5)
 New Cumberland Choir – choir (3, 7, 9)
 Greg Thomas – New Cumberland Choir contractor (3, 7, 9)
 The Choristers of Reigate St. Mary's – boychoir (3, 9)
 John Tobin – Reigate St. Mary's choir master (3, 9)
 Mandisa – vocals (5)
 Bonnie Keen – backing vocals (11)

Production 
 Michael W. Smith – producer, executive producer
 David Hamilton – producer, digital editing
 Michael Blanton – executive producer
 Ronnie Brookshire – rhythm section recording
 Mark Petaccia – rhythm section recording assistant
 Humberto Gatica – orchestra recording, additional piano recording
 Andrew Dudman – orchestra recording, boychoir recording additional piano recording  
 Fred Paragano – additional piano recording
 David Schober – additional piano recording, mixing
 Dominic Christie – boychoir recording assistant
 Scrap Marshall – boychoir recording assistant
 Jeff Pitzer – recording (violin solo on "Song for the King")
 Bill Whittington – recording (New Cumberland Choir and Highland bagpipes)
 Lowell Reynolds – recording assistant (New Cumberland Choir and Highland bagpipes)
 Doug Sarrett – recording (The Nashville Choir and Children's Choir)
 Steven Beers – recording assistant (The Nashville Choir and Children's Choir)
 Dave Dillbeck – vocal recording, digital editing
 Derik Lee – vocal recording (Mandisa's vocal)
 Brian Calhoon – mix assistant 
 Jeff Cain – digital editing
 Andrew Mendelson – mastering
 Melissa Leonelli – librarian, production assistant
 Ken Johnson – production manager
 Jason McArthur – A&R coordination
 Michelle Box – A&R production
 Allen Clark – photography
 Stephanie McBrayer – art direction, stylist
 Tim Parker – art direction
 Michealle Vanderpoolhair – hair, make-up

Studios
 Blackbird Studios (Nashville, Tennessee) – recording location, New Cumberland Choir and Highland bagpipes for rhythm section.
 Brentwood Baptist Church (Brentwood, Tennessee) – The Nashville Choir and Children's Choir recording location.
 Deer Valley Studios (Franklin, Tennessee) – vocal recording location.
 Paragon Studios (Franklin, Tennessee) – vocal and additional piano recording location, mixing location.
 Studio One at Abbey Road Studios (London, England) – recording location for orchestra, boychoir and additional piano.
 Legacy Recording Studios (New York City, New York) – Mandisa's vocal recording location.
 Georgetown Masters (Nashville, Tennessee) – mastering location.

Charts

References

Michael W. Smith albums
2007 Christmas albums
Christmas albums by American artists
Pop Christmas albums
Reunion Records albums